Hanna Hermansson (born 18 May 1989) is a Swedish middle-distance runner. She represented her country in the 800 metres at the 2017 World Championships reaching the semifinals.

International competitions

Personal bests

Outdoor
400 metres – 56.24 (Celle Ligure 2017)
600 metres – 1:35.9 (Santa Barbara 2015)
800 metres – 2:00.43 (London 2017)
1000 metres – 2:38.13 (Gothenburg 2017)
1500 metres – 4:07.16 (Berlin 2018)
One mile – 4:59.72 (Claremont 2016)
5000 metres – 17:47.30 (Aliso Viejo 2017)

Indoor
800 metres – 2:02.80 (New York 2018)

References

1989 births
Living people
Swedish female middle-distance runners
World Athletics Championships athletes for Sweden
Athletes from Stockholm
Swedish Athletics Championships winners
21st-century Swedish women